The men's pole vault event at the 2015 European Athletics Indoor Championships was held on 6 March at 10:15 (qualification) and 7 March at 17:00 (final) local time.

Medalists

Results

Qualification
Qualification: Qualification Performance 5.75 (Q) or at least 8 best performers advanced to the final.

Final

References

2015 European Athletics Indoor Championships
Pole vault at the European Athletics Indoor Championships